Laura Karasek (born April 29, 1982) is a German author, television moderator, lawyer, columnist and actor.

Life and career 
Laura Karasek was born on April 29, 1982 in Hamburg, Germany. After completing her Abitur, she studied law in Berlin, Frankfurt and Paris. From 2011, she worked for the chancellery Clifford Chance. She is also a lawyer in a corporate law firm based in Frankfurt.

Karasek was several times a guest on Markus Lanz, ZDF-Fernsehgarten, and other shows.

Personal life 
In 2013, Karasek married the banker Dominic Briggs. The couple have twins born in 2015. From December 2021, Karasek reinforced a few times the cabaret artist Florian Schroeder as editorial director in the Florian Schroeder Satire Show on ARD. In 2022, she was a co-founder of PEN Berlin.

Works
Laura Karasek: Verspielte Jahre. 2nd edition. Bastei Lübbe Quadriga, Cologne 2012, .
Laura Karasek: Ja, die sind echt: Geschichten über Frauen und Männer. Eichborn, Cologne 2019, .
Laura Karasek: Drei Wünsche. 3. Auflage. Eichborn, Cologne 2019, .

References

External links

Laura Karasek on IMDb
Literature from and about Laura Karasek in the German National Library

Living people
German women writers
1982 births
Actresses from Hamburg